This Is Spinal Tap (or simply Spinal Tap) is the soundtrack to the film This Is Spinal Tap, released in 1984. It was re-released in 2000 with lyrics and two versions of "Christmas with the Devil" as bonus tracks. The cover art is identical to that of the fictional album Smell the Glove featured in the film.

Track listing

Other appearances
"Gimme Some Money" was featured in the 1991 comedy film Don't Tell Mom the Babysitter's Dead.

The song "Tonight I'm Gonna Rock You Tonight" is featured in the video game Guitar Hero II. When played as the encore song at the end of the career mode's second tier, the in-game band's drummer spontaneously combusts upon the song's completion, a direct reference to This Is Spinal Tap. Its riff is borrowed in the song "Athlete Cured" from the 1988 album by The Fall, The Frenz Experiment.

Seattle grunge band Soundgarden covered the song "Big Bottom" several times at their early live shows, documented on their live video Louder Than Live as well as on the Netherlands release of their 1992 "Rusty Cage" single.

San Francisco queercore band Pansy Division recorded a same-sex edit of "Big Bottom" in 1993.  The track was included in their 1995 compilation album Pile Up.

"Stonehenge" is featured in the 2006 Supernatural season two episode, "Simon Said".

In early 2007, American Express Small Business Services used "Gimme Some Money" (with vocals) as background music in a television ad.

At the Live Earth concert during the summer of 2007, Spinal Tap performed "Big Bottom" at Wembley Stadium with members of many of the other acts from the festival, including members of Beastie Boys, Metallica, Foo Fighters, and many others, all playing bass guitars. Their set also included "Stonehenge" and "Warmer Than Hell."

Personnel

Spinal Tap
David St. Hubbins (Michael McKean) – lead vocals and guitar, bass guitar on "Big Bottom"
Nigel Tufnel (Christopher Guest) – lead guitar, mandolin, and vocals, bass guitar on "Big Bottom"
Derek Smalls (Harry Shearer) – bass guitar and vocals
Viv Savage (David Kaff) – keyboards and vocals
Mick Shrimpton (Ric Parnell) – drums and percussion

Additional personnel
Harlan Collins – synthesizers
John Sinclair – keyboards

Production
Produced by Christopher Guest, Michael McKean and Harry Shearer
Recorded, engineered and mixed by Patrick McDonald
Editing: Kenneth Karman

References

External links
 Spinal Tap – official band site

1980s film soundtrack albums
Spinal Tap (band) albums
1984 soundtrack albums
Polydor Records soundtracks
Comedy rock soundtracks
Hard rock soundtracks